Liberated Fantasies is the eighth studio album by American keyboardist George Duke. It was recorded and mixed by Kerry McNabb at Paramount Recording Studios in Hollywood, California in 1976 and released through MPS Records, making it Duke's seventh and final album for the label. The album features contributions from Alphonso Johnson and Leon "Ndugu" Chancler with guest appearances from several musicians, including vocalist Napoleon Murphy Brock, guitarist Daryl Stuermer, percussionists Airto Moreira and Emil Richards.

Reaching a peak position of number 190 on the US Billboard 200, the album remained on the chart for a total of two weeks.

Track listing

Personnel 
 George Duke – vocals, keyboards, synthesizer, producer
 Napoleon Murphy Brock – lead vocals (track 5), backing vocals (tracks: 2, 9)
 Bonnie Bowdon Amaro – vocals (tracks: 7, 9)
 Rashid Duke – vocals (track 4)
 Janet Ferguson Hoff – backing vocals (tracks: 2, 4)
 Ruth Komanoff – backing vocals (track 4)
 Leon "Ndugu" Chancler – vocals (track 9), drums, goblet drum
 George Johnson – guitar (track 1)
 Daryl Stuermer – guitar (tracks: 5, 9)
 David Amaro – acoustic guitar (track 7)
 Alphonso Johnson – bass
 Airto Moreira – percussion (tracks: 6, 7, 9)
 Emil Richards – marimba (track 6)
 Kerry McNabb – mixing & recording
 Baldhard G. Falk – executive producer
 Cal Schenkel – design & photography
 Herb Cohen – management

Chart history

Notes

References

External links 
 
 George Duke's 1970s discography on his website

1975 albums
George Duke albums
MPS Records albums
Albums produced by George Duke